CPPM may refer to:
 Carlos Pedro Pablo Miguel - the first names of the Eden Field Alpacas
 Centre de Physique des Particules de Marseille - a research laboratory in Southern France
 Certified Physician Practice Manager through AAPC
 Certified Practising Project Manager
 Certified Professional Purchasing Manager through American Purchasing Society
 Chaotic pulse position modulation (CPPM)
 Content Protection for Pre-recorded Media see Content Protection for Recordable Media
 Content Protection for Playback Media